Jean Chrisostome Mekongo Ondoa (born 21 March 1983 in Douala, Cameroon) is a Cameroonian footballer.

Biography
Ondoa started his European career at Sampdoria. In February 2001, along with Thomas Job and Francis Zé, he was investigated by the FIGC for using false documents in order to be treated as a European Union citizen. The investigation found that he had used a fake French identity card to enter Italy and a fake Portuguese passport to finish the player registration, which was directed  by his agent. In July 2001, all three were banned for 6 months. In February 2002, he was loaned to Cremonese along with Zé. In the 2002-03, season he remained at Cremonese and Job joined him on loan. Ondoa remained at Cremonese at the start of 2003-04 season.

In the middle of the 2003-04 season, he joined the Swiss Challenge League side (from the Italian speaking region) Bellinzona, playing his first match for them in round 17, losing 2-3 to Chiasso. During the 2004-05 season, he joined Naftex Burgas.

References

External links
 Swiss Football league Profile 
 Profile at Lega Calcio 
 

Cameroonian footballers
Cameroonian expatriate footballers
U.C. Sampdoria players
U.S. Cremonese players
AC Bellinzona players
Neftochimic Burgas players
Association football midfielders
Expatriate footballers in Italy
Expatriate footballers in Switzerland
Expatriate footballers in Bulgaria
Footballers from Douala
1983 births
Living people